Skeleton Creek may refer to:

 Skeleton Creek (Oklahoma), a river in Oklahoma
 Skeleton Creek (Queensland) in Cairns, Queensland, Australia
 Skeleton Creek (Victoria)
 Skeleton Creek Trail, which runs alongside the southern section Melbourne's Skeleton Creek
 Skeleton Creek (novel), the first novel in the Skeleton Creek Saga by Patrick Carman